Mussaenda macrophylla, commonly known as sweet root is an evergreen Asian shrub. The bracts of the shrub may have different shades, including red, white or some mixtures.  M. macrophylla is native to Asian countries like China, Taiwan, Nepal, Myanmar, Malaysia, Philippines.

References 

macrophylla
Flora of Nepal
Plants described in 1824